Behnam Tashakkor is an Iranian actor born on January 24, 1977 Bandar Anzali, Iran. Tashakkor has played in some cinema movies and TV series, for example Mokhtarnameh.

Life 
He was born on January 24, 1977, in Bandar Anzali to an Ardabili Azeri family. He spent his childhood in the city of Hashtpar.

He started his activity in theater by playing in a comedy show in Sari named "Mirza Ferfere" in 1996. He got his bachelor's degree in business economics from Azad university of Firuzkuh.

References

External links
 Behnam Tashakkor in Internet Movie Database
 Behnam Tashakkor in Internet database of Soureh Cinema
 

Iranian male television actors
People from Bandar-e Anzali
Iranian Azerbaijanis
1977 births
Living people
Iranian male stage actors
Iranian radio actors
Iranian radio and television presenters